Sexuality and Its Discontents: Meanings, Myths, and Modern Sexualities is a 1985 book about the politics and philosophy of sex by the sociologist Jeffrey Weeks. The book received positive reviews, crediting Weeks with explaining the theories of sexologists and usefully discussing controversial sexual issues. However, Weeks was criticised for his treatment of feminism and sado-masochism.

Summary

Weeks aims to "show the historical, theoretical and political forces" behind a contemporary "crisis of sexual values ... rooted in a sexual and sexological tradition which has ascribed an inflated importance to sexuality". He discusses the views of scientists and philosophers on sex, provides a "critical examination of the tradition of psychoanalysis", considers the theories and practices of the feminist and gay rights movements, and tries to "question the neutrality of sexual science". He writes that Sexuality and Its Discontents could be considered the third volume of a trilogy of books on related themes, following Coming Out: Homosexual Politics in Britain from the Nineteenth Century to the Present (1977) and Sex, Politics and Society: The Regulation of Sexuality Since 1800 (1981).

Authors Weeks discusses include the biologist Charles Darwin, the psychiatrist Richard von Krafft-Ebing, Sigmund Freud (the founder of psychoanalysis), the physician Havelock Ellis, the anthropologist Bronisław Malinowski, the biologist Alfred Kinsey, the psychoanalyst Wilhelm Reich, the philosopher Herbert Marcuse, the psychoanalyst Erich Fromm, the psychoanalyst Jacques Lacan, the anthropologist Margaret Mead, the philosopher Michel Foucault, the biologist Edward O. Wilson, the psychologist Alan P. Bell, the sociologist Martin S. Weinberg, the anthropologist Donald Symons, the philosopher Roger Scruton, the activist Tom O'Carroll, the anthropologist Gayle Rubin, and the writer Pat Califia. He examines various issues including homosexuality, pedophilia, pornography, prostitution, and sado-masochism. He criticises O'Carroll's Paedophilia: The Radical Case (1980). He also discusses and criticises sociobiology.

Publication history
Sexuality and Its Discontents was first published by Routledge & Kegan Paul Ltd in 1985. It was reprinted several times by Routledge.

Reception
Sexuality and Its Discontents received positive reviews from Christopher Meade in New Statesman, N. W. Bell in Choice, Jim Monk in The Body Politic, and the gay rights activist Dennis Altman in The Advocate, Michael-Roy Kingham in The Sociological Review, the sociologist Barry D. Adam in the American Journal of Sociology, the sociologist Michael Messner in The Social Science Journal, and Peter F. Murphy in Feminist Studies, a mixed review from the sociologist William Simon in Contemporary Sociology, and a negative review from the sociologist Stephen O. Murray in the Journal of Homosexuality. The book was also reviewed by Lisa Davis in Psychology Today and discussed by the sociologist Ray Pahl in New Statesman & Society.

Meade described the book as a "sensitive study" that "succeeds in locating many widely felt uncertainties, sharpening them up into pointed and timely questions for the future". However, he noted that Weeks included little discussion of fertility and child care and avoided "tackling the full extent of feminism's critique of male defined society". Bell credited Weeks with explaining the "underlying assumptions, modes of expression, and political implications of writings as diverse as scientific-sex research, psychoanalysis, lesbian feminism, and the advocacy of rights for sadomasochists and pedofiliacs." He concluded that, "No serious student of sexuality can afford to miss this book."

Monk described the book as a "scholarly work that is enjoyable to read and highly instructive." However, he wrote that the position on sexual morality advocated by Weeks, "radical pluralism", was described only in general terms. He also criticised Weeks's discussion of sado-masochism, writing that Weeks's view that "a powerful argument against S/M's playful use of the symbols of power and domination is the existence of real oppression and exploitation" had "emotional strength" but was dubiously logical. He was also dissatisfied by Weeks's discussion of the age of consent, arguing that it contradicted views Weeks had expressed in other places of his book and left various issues unresolved.

Altman endorsed Weeks's view that gay men's sexual promiscuity should not be viewed as compulsive and pathological, and expressed sympathy for his "liberationist" view of sexuality. He praised his discussion of gay identity, his socialist politics, and his "ability to expound complex ideas clearly". In another discussion, Altman maintained that Weeks was correct to maintain that AIDS had been surrounded by "moral panic" of a kind typical of societies in a process of rapid change.

Kingham considered Weeks's aim of explaining the contemporary crisis of sexual values ambitious and only partly successful. However, he found Weeks's project promising, and credited him with providing "a valuable analysis and critique of the arguments used by those who see sex as govemed by natural forces" and with exposing the "naturalistic basis" of the theories of early sexologists. He praised Weeks's discussions of Darwin, Krafft-Ebing, Freud, Ellis, Kinsey, and Wilson, writing that Weeks showed "the key ideas embedded in their discourses", including their use of metaphor, but he added that Weeks perhaps "does less than justice to the anthropological position" and should have drawn on more recent anthropological and ethological evidence. He also complimented Weeks's discussions of other authors such as Malinowski and Mead, his examination of the work of Fromm, Marcuse, Reich, and Lacan, to see what they can contribute to "an adequate explanation of human desire", and his examination of controversial issues such as public sex, intergenerational sex, pornography, and sado-masochism, though he noted that other reviewers had been more critical of Weeks's views. He compared the book to Scruton's Sexual Desire (1986), noting that while his conclusions were different, Scruton addressed the same range of issues. He also considered the two books similar in structure and content.

Adam wrote that the book had "the potential to become a basic text in sex and gender studies" and deserved recognition from sociologists. He credited Weeks with providing a careful and fair summary of "the sexological tradition" and "a trenchant critique of sociobiology". However, he criticised Weeks for failing to provide a "systematic treatment of family, population, and sexual policies in the light of modern theories of the state." Messner credited Weeks with developing Foucault's insights, showing that "power and control are fluid and multicentered, and thus engender a multiplicity of resistances", and providing a challenging "theoretical reformulation of the sexuality and society debates". He also complimented Weeks's writing, finding it clearer than that of Foucault. However, he believed that there is "little new in Weeks's critical assessments of the historical role of various theories of sexuality." He agreed with Weeks's criticisms of psychoanalysis, and of authors such as Reich and Marcuse, but found them unoriginal, expressing the same view of Weeks's assessment of sexologists such as Ellis and Kinsey. Murphy believed that, along with Emmanuel Reynaud's Holy Virility (1981) and other, similar writings about masculinity by men, the book provided a basis for "rethinking the male experience." Simon wrote that the book was "rich with ideas" and that Weeks's discussion of psychoanalysis benefited from his use of feminist scholarship. However, he believed Weeks overstated the case for a social constructionist understanding of human sexuality.

Murray wrote that Weeks provided "an impressionistic account of contemporary conflicts about sex" that was "fairly interesting but inconclusive" and a "tendentious pseudohistory" of sexology. He criticised Weeks for rejecting attempts to explain sex in terms of biology and described his "methods in general" as "inadequate", accusing him of over-relying on secondary sources, making "little effort to understand the context of earlier discourses about sex", and failing to make clear that there is a "research tradition of sexology"; he also faulted his treatment of psychology, sociology, and anthropology. He considered Weeks's discussion of anthropologists such as Mead and Malinowski distorted, described his dismissal of Marcuse as "essentialist" as a form of "name-calling", and faulted his arguments about the social construction of homosexuality.

The economist Richard Posner described Sexuality and Its Discontents as a "polemical" but readable work. The political scientist Sheila Jeffreys noted that in his discussion of sado-masochism, Weeks "quotes lesbian rather than male gay theorists" and mentions "only lesbian sadomasochism". She criticised Weeks for approving of the work of Califia and Rubin, questioning whether they deserved to be considered feminists. She also criticised him for neglecting writers she considered more genuinely feminist and expressing a negative view of the work of radical feminists opposed to sado-masochism. Robert R. Reilly credited Weeks with correctly observing that the American Psychiatric Association declassified homosexuality because of gay activism.

References

Bibliography
Books

 
 
 
 
 

Journals

 
 
  
  
  
  
 
  
 
 
  
 

1985 non-fiction books
Books about psychoanalysis
Books about the philosophy of sexuality
Books by Jeffrey Weeks (sociologist)
English-language books
Routledge books
Sociology books